Platygobiopsis is a genus of gobies native to the western Pacific Ocean.

Species
There are currently four recognized species in this genus:
 Platygobiopsis akihito V. G. Springer & J. E. Randall, 1992 (Imperial goby)
 Platygobiopsis dispar Prokofiev, 2008
Platygobiopsis hadiatyae 
 Platygobiopsis tansei Okiyama, 2008

References

Gobiidae
Marine fish genera
Taxa named by Victor G. Springer
Taxa named by John Ernest Randall